Guldhedens IK is a Swedish football club located in Göteborg.

Background
Guldhedens Idrottsklubb is a sports club catering for football, floorball and handball.  The aim of the club is to offer children and young people in the vicinity an opportunity to meet and play sports together. There are now about 500 members of the association.

The club's key objective is to jointly develop and nurture players who at some time in the future may reach a level that extends to the national team. To date GIK has developed Anders Svensson who has progressed to play in the national team.

Guldhedens IK currently plays in Division 4 Göteborg A which is the sixth tier of Swedish football. They play their home matches at the Bergsjövallen and Mossens IP in Göteborg.

The club is affiliated to Göteborgs Fotbollförbund. Guldhedens IK have competed in the Svenska Cupen on 12 occasions and have played 22 matches in the competition.

Season to season

Attendances

In recent seasons IF Warta have had the following average attendances:

Footnotes

External links
 Guldhedens IK – Official website
 Guldhedens IK on Facebook

Football clubs in Gothenburg
Football clubs in Västra Götaland County